The T-15 Armata, with industrial designation "Object 149", is a Russian heavy infantry fighting vehicle first seen in public (initially with its turret covered) in 2015 during rehearsals for the Moscow Victory Day Parade. The T-15 concept of a heavy IFV is derived from design of the BTR-T vehicle (based on the T-55 chassis) that never entered military service. The existing BMP-3M is a completely different vehicle, designed on a light tank chassis and supposed to be succeeded by the Kurganetz-25 platform.

Background
The infantry fighting vehicle concept was first conceived of in the 1960s during the Cold War, where a confrontation between NATO and Warsaw Pact countries was expected to be dominated by tanks, so infantry required transport to sustain the pace of advance while having armament to fight tanks, and armor to withstand machine gun and artillery fire; the Soviet Union created the BMP-1/BMP-2 and the United States the M2 Bradley. While IFVs provided troops with heavier mounted firepower, the prevalence of anti-tank rockets and guided missiles made it uneconomical to protect them from such weapons. Post-Cold War, rather than maneuver warfare, most fighting took place in urban areas, such as what the Russians experienced in Grozny. While heavy losses can be tolerated in a near-peer conflict, the ease at which insurgent ambushes using anti-tank weaponry can inflict casualties by targeting IFVs has become an issue for IFV operators. In an effort to field better protected troop carriers, some countries have experimented with converting tank hulls to carry dismounted infantry, such as Israel with the Namer.

The Russian T-15 is based on the T-14 tank hull, with its engine relocated to the front to accommodate a passenger compartment in the rear. This adjusted engine position provides additional crew protection against frontal attacks. Passenger capacity is estimated at between seven and nine troops.  At 48 tons, the vehicle is slightly heavier than the T-90 main battle tank.  It has a built-in entrenching blade and the T-14's numerous cameras and sensors.

Design

Armament

The T-15 Armata can be fitted with:

 The Bumerang-BM (Epoch) remote control weapon station turret with a 2A42 30 mm autocannon, a 7.62 mm coaxial PKT and a bank of two 9M133M Kornet-M anti-tank guided missiles on both sides
 The AU-220M Baikal remote turret that features a 57 mm autocannon BM-57 and the 9M120-1M Ataka guided anti-tank missiles
 DUBM-57 Kinzhal RCWS with BM-57 autocannon, 7.62mm PKMT machine gun, and 9M120-1 Ataka ATGMs

Mobility
Like the T-14, the T-15 is based on the Armata Universal Combat Platform, but unlike the T-14 it has its engine in the front.

Protection
Like the T-14, the T-15 is protected by reactive armour and the Afganit active protection system. While the T-14 has its Afganit launch tubes at the base of its turret, the T-15 has them arrayed along the top sides of its hull. It uses four soft-kill launchers to deploy smoke grenades that disrupt visual and infrared guidance systems, and five hard-kill launch tubes on top of the hull, compared to the T-14's ten hard-kill tubes on the turret which automatically turns to face a threat.

The T-15 has "an unprecedented level of armor protection," including improved passive steel and ceramic composite plate armor and a slat armor cage at the rear. Its new Malakhit (Malachite) explosive reactive armour (ERA) is claimed to protect against ATGMs like the FGM-148 Javelin, Missile Moyenne Portée (MMP), 120 mm tank rounds like the German DM53/DM63, and American M829A3 armour-piercing fin-stabilized discarding sabot (APFSDS). In addition to hard-kill and soft-kill APS, the developer uses a special paint that significantly reduces the vehicle's infrared signature.

The floor is reinforced with an added armor plate to protect against land mines and improvised explosive devices (IEDs). It also has a radar jamming and deception system to detonate radio-controlled anti-tank mines, and an NBC protection system.

Variants
BMP-KSh: Command post variant, has the turret removed and replaced by additional power supply equipment.

Operator

Russian Ground Forces

See also
 Armata Universal Combat Platform
 Kurganets-25
 VPK-7829 Bumerang
 Typhoon (AFV family)
 Namer – Israeli HAPC on the Merkava chassis
 VN20 – Chinese HIFV developed from the VT-4 chassis

Image gallery

References

External links

Infantry fighting vehicles
Tracked infantry fighting vehicles
Infantry fighting vehicles of Russia
Uralvagonzavod products